Catherine Eileen Fife  (born ) is a politician in Ontario, Canada. She is a New Democratic member of the Legislative Assembly of Ontario who represents the riding of Waterloo. She has been a Member of Provincial Parliament since first winning her seat in the 2012 Kitchener—Waterloo byelection.

Background
Prior to entering politics, she spent 10 years with the Toronto District School Board as an educational assistant, a school community advisor and a settlement worker for new immigrants. She was the research coordinator for the Partnerships for Children and Families Project at Wilfrid Laurier University. She lives in Kitchener-Waterloo with her husband Dale and their two children.

Politics
Fife was elected to represent Waterloo/Wilmot as a trustee for the Waterloo Region District School Board in 2003, and was re-elected in 2006 and 2010.

In the 2007 provincial election, Fife ran as the New Democrat candidate in the riding of Kitchener—Waterloo. She came in third behind incumbent Progressive Conservative Elizabeth Witmer and Liberal candidate Louise Ervin.

After Witmer resigned to take a position with the Workplace Safety & Insurance Board, Fife ran in a by-election on September 6, 2012 to replace her. She defeated Progressive Conservative candidate Tracey Weiler by 3,748 votes. She was re-elected in the 2014 provincial election defeating Liberal candidate Jamie Burton by 3,843 votes.

She is the party's critic for Jobs, Employment, Research and Innovation and the Chair for Standing Committee on Public Accounts.

Election results

References

External links

1960s births
Living people
Ontario New Democratic Party MPPs
Ontario school board trustees
Politicians from Waterloo, Ontario
Women MPPs in Ontario
21st-century Canadian politicians
21st-century Canadian women politicians